The 2010–11 Primera División Profesional season is the 64th professional season top-flight football league. The season is split into two parts Apertura and Clausura each of which includes a tournament —the Torneo Apertura and the Torneo Clausura. Each part has an identical format and each is contested by the same eighteen teams.

Clubs

Eighteen teams return for this season. Indios de Ciudad Juárez was relegated the previous season after accumulated the lowest coefficient over the past three seasons. Necaxa won promotion into the first division, returning after one year in the Liga de Ascenso.

Managerial changes

Torneo Apertura
The 2010 Torneo Apertura began on July 23, 2010 and ended on December 12, 2010.

Classification phase

Overall table

Group standings

Results

Final phase

 If the two teams are tied after both legs, the higher seeded team advances.
 Both finalist qualify to the 2011–12 CONCACAF Champions League. The champion qualifies directly to the Group Stage, while the runner-up qualifies to the Preliminary Round.

Top goalscorers

Torneo Clausura
The 2011 Torneo Clausura began on January 8, 2011 and ended on May 22, 2011.

Classification phase

Overall table

Group standings

Results

Final phase

 If the two teams are tied after both legs, the higher seeded team advances.
 Both finalist qualify to the 2011–12 CONCACAF Champions League. The champion qualifies directly to the Group Stage, while the runner-up qualifies to the Preliminary Round.

Top goalscorers

Relegation

Source: FeMexFut

References

External links
 Clausura 2011 fixtures, tables and top scorers at ESPN Soccernet
2010–11 Primera División de México season at Soccerway

2010-11 Primera Division de Mexico season
2010–11 domestic association football leagues
1
2010-11